Gliese 408 is a star located 21.6 light years from the Solar System, located in the constellation of Leo. The stars nearest to Gliese 408 are Gliese 402, at 6.26 light years, and AD Leonis, at 6.26 light years.

Gliese 408 is a red dwarf with a spectral type of M2.5V. Much dimmer than the Sun, it has a luminosity of only 0.37% compared to the Sun, but still it is much more luminous than other red dwarf stars, like Proxima Centauri. Its effective temperature is about 3400 to 3500 K; its mass is about 41% compared to the Sun, and its radius is about 43% that of the Sun. Its rotational velocity is at most 2.3 km/s. No evidence of a circumstellar disk has been found around Gliese 408.

References

M-type main-sequence stars
0408
053767
Leo (constellation)